Danielle Charlotte Belgrave is a Trinidadian-British computer scientist based at DeepMind, who uses statistics and machine learning to understand the progression of diseases.

Early life and education 
Belgrave grew up in Trinidad and Tobago, where her high school mathematics teacher inspired her to work as a data scientist. She studied statistics and business at the London School of Economics (LSE). She was a graduate student at University College London (UCL), where she earned a master's degree in statistics. She was awarded a Dorothy Hodgkin postgraduate award by Microsoft and the Barry Kay Award by the British Society of Allergy and Clinical Immunology (BSACI).

Research and career 
After graduating, Belgrave worked at GlaxoSmithKline (GSK), where she was awarded the Exceptional Scientist Award. Belgrave joined Imperial College London as a Medical Research Council (MRC) statistician in 2015. She develops statistical machine learning models to look at disease progression in an effort to design new management strategies and understand heterogeneity. Statistical learning methods can inform the management of medical conditions by providing a framework for endotype discovery using probabilistic modelling. She uses statistical models to identify the underlying endotypes of a condition from a set of phenotypes.

She studied whether atopic march, the progression of allergic diseases from early life, adequately describes atopic diseases like eczema in early life. Belgrave used a latent disease profile model to study atopic march in over 9,000 children, where machine learning was used to identify groups of children with similar eczema onset patterns. She is part of the study team for early life asthma research consortium. Belgrave is interested in using big data for meaningful clinical interpretation, to inform personalised prevention strategies.

Her research focuses on Bayesian and statistical machine learning within the healthcare to develop personalised medicine.  Belgrave is developing and implementing methods which incorporate domain knowledge with data-driven models. Her research interests include latent variable models, longitudinal studies, survival analysis, ‘omics, dimensionality reduction, Bayesian graphical models and cluster analysis.

Belgrave is part of the regulatory algorithms project, which evaluates how healthcare algorithms should be regulated. In particular, Belgrave is interested in what scheme of liability should be imposed on artificial intelligence for healthcare. She serves on the 2019 organising committee of the Conference on Neural Information Processing Systems and as an advisor for DeepAfricAI.

References 

Year of birth missing (living people)
Living people
Trinidad and Tobago emigrants to the United Kingdom
British women computer scientists
Academics of Imperial College London
Alumni of the University of Manchester
Alumni of University College London
Alumni of the London School of Economics